Due is a surname. Notable people with the name include:

 Alessandro Duè (born 1913), Italian footballer
 Alette Due (1812–1887), Norwegian singer and composer
 Anders Due (born 1982), Danish footballer
 Christian Due-Boje (born 1966), Swedish ice-hockey player
 Frederik Due (1796–1873), Norwegian military officer and statesman
 Frederik Due (footballer) (born 1992), Danish footballer
 Henrik Adam Due (1891–1966), Norwegian violinist
 Louise Bager Due (born 1982), Danish Olympic handball player
 Mary Barratt Due (1888–1969), Norwegian pianist
 Ole Due (1931–2005), Danish judge
 Patricia Stephens Due (1939–2012), African-American civil rights activist
 Paul Due (1835–1919), Norwegian architect
 Paul Armin Due (1870–1926), Norwegian architect
 Peter Due (born 1947), Danish Olympic sailor
 Reidar Due (born 1922), Norwegian politician
 Steen Due (1898–1974), Danish Olympic field-hockey player
 Stephan Barratt-Due (born 1956), Norwegian violinist
 Stephan Henrik Barratt-Due (1919–1985), Norwegian violinist
 Tananarive Due (born 1966), American writer
 Thomas Due (born 1971), Norwegian curler

See also 
 Stefan Due Schmidt (born 1994), Danish Olympic speed skater
 Due (disambiguation)
 Duer, a surname (including a list of people with the name)

Surnames from nicknames
Norwegian-language surnames
Danish-language surnames